Bardbol may refer to:
 Bardbol, Shirvan, a village in Shirvan Rural District, Central District of Borujerd County, Lorestan Province, Iran
 Bardbol, Valanjerd, a village in Valanjerd Rural District, Central District of Borujerd County, Lorestan Province, Iran
 Bardbol, Selseleh, a village in Selseleh County, Lorestan Province, Iran